Asilulu is an Austronesian language of Ambon Island in the Moluccas, with some speakers on west Seram. It is a local trade language.

References

Further reading

 

Central Maluku languages
Languages of Indonesia
Seram Island